The Rewind Festival is an annual music festival that takes place in Temple Island Meadows, Remenham, Berkshire near Henley-on-Thames, England, Capesthorne Hall, Cheshire, England, and Scone Palace, Perthshire in Scotland. It was first held in August 2009.

Originally called "80s Rewind Festival", it showcases bands and solo artists that had success in the 1980s and as such is also known as the 80's Rewind Festival. As well as music, in 2009 the site also featured a fun fair, street entertainment and artists from The Comedy Store.

The festival is run by The Rival Organisation and Into The Groove, and was started after the success of one-off 1980s retro shows of previous years.

Since its creation a number of  additional attractions were included at the festival, including a weekend camp site, glamping, firework displays, theme bars, silent disco, roller disco, the Big Sing, live karaoke stage, and the Friday night welcome party.

In 2019 the capacities of the festivals were Scotland: 30,000, South: 40,000, and North: 20,000.

80s Rewind Festival 2009 

The initial edition took place on the 21, 22 and 23 August 2009. Acts playing include Kim Wilde, Rick Astley, Gloria Gaynor and Sister Sledge.

Rewind Festival 2010 
The second 1980s Rewind Festival took place on 20, 21 & 22 August 2010. The line-up for this event was announced on Thursday 28 January 2010. The event featured a 1980s fancy dress theme using costumes supplied by sponsor Jokers' Masquerade.

Rewind Festival 2011 
The third 1980s Rewind Festival held two separate concerts. A number of additional attractions were included at the festival:

 Weekend camp site
 Firework displays
 Theme bars
 Silent disco
 The Big Sing
 Live karaoke stage

Perth date 
The Scottish 1980s Rewind Festival took place at the Scone Palace grounds near Perth on the 29, 30 and 31 July 2011.

Henley-on-Thames date 
The English 1980s Rewind Festival took place at Temple Island Meadows, Remenham Farm, Remenham, near Henley-on-Thames on 19, 20 and 21 August 2011.

Rewind Festival 2012 
The fourth 1980s Rewind Festival was held on two separate occasions to provide concerts for both Scotland and England.

Perth date 
The Scottish 1980s Rewind Festival took place at the Scone Palace grounds near Perth on 20, 21 and 22 July 2012.

Henley-on-Thames date 
The English 1980s Rewind Festival took place at Temple Island Meadows, Remenham Farm, Remenham, near Henley-on-Thames on 17, 18 and 19 August 2012.

Rewind Festival 2013

Perth date 
The Scottish Rewind Festival took place at the Scone Palace grounds near Perth on 26th, 27 and 28 July 2013.

Henley-on-Thames date 
The English Rewind Festival took place at Temple Island Meadows, Remenham Farm, Remenham, near Henley-on-Thames on 16, 17 and 18 August 2013.

Rewind Festival 2014 
For 2014, there were three festivals held due to the success from previous years.

Perth date 
The Rewind Festival in Scotland took place at the Scone Palace grounds near Perth on 18, 19 and 20 July 2014.

Henley-on-Thames date 
The Rewind Festival South took place at Temple Island Meadows, Remenham Farm, Remenham, near Henley-on-Thames on 15, 16 and 17 August 2014.

Capesthorne Hall 
The Rewind Festival North took place at Capesthorne Hall, Cheshire on 29, 30 and 31 August 2014.

Rewind Festival 2015

Perth date 
The Rewind Festival in Scotland took place at the Scone Palace grounds near Perth on 24, 25, and 26 July 2015.

Henley-on-Thames date 
The Rewind Festival South took place at Temple Island Meadows, Remenham Farm, Remenham, near Henley-on-Thames on 21, 22 and 23 August 2015.

Rewind Festival 2016

Perth date 
The Rewind Festival in Scotland took place at the Scone Palace grounds near Perth on 23, 23, and 24 July 2016, and was headlined by Holly Johnson on Saturday and Adam Ant on Sunday.

Rewind North
The 2016 will be held at Capesthorne Hall in Cheshire from 5, 6, 7 August 2016.

Henley-on-Thames 
The Rewind Festival South took place at Temple Island Meadows, Remenham Farm, Remenham, near Henley-on-Thames on 19, 20 and 21 August 2016.

Rewind Festival 2017

Rewind Scotland 
The Rewind Festival in Scotland took place at the Scone Palace grounds near Perth on 21, 22, and 23 July 2017, and was headlined by The Human League on the Saturday and Billy Ocean on the Sunday.

Rewind North
The 2017 festival was held at Capesthorne Hall in Cheshire; on the 4, 5 and 6 August 2017.

Rewind South 
The Rewind Festival South took place at Temple Island Meadows, Remenham Farm, Remenham, near Henley-on-Thames on 18, 19 and 20 August 2017.

Rewind Festival 2018

Rewind Scotland 
The Rewind Festival in Scotland took place at the Scone Palace grounds near Perth on 20, 21, and 22 July 2018, and was headlined by OMD and Status Quo.

Rewind North 
The Rewind North Festival took place at Capesthorne Hall in Cheshire on 3, 4, and 5 August 2018, and was headlined by OMD and the Jacksons.

Rewind South 
The Rewind South Festival took place at the Temple Island Meadows, Remenham Farm, Remenham, near Henley-on-Thames on 17, 18, and 19 August 2018, and was headlined by Kool and the Gang and OMD.

Rewind Festival 2019

Rewind Scotland 
The Rewind Festival in Scotland took place at the Scone Palace grounds near Perth on 19–21 July. The Friday lineup consisted of Martin Kemp, Magic Nostalgic, and Ray Gun's Look Real Enough on the Forever Stage; Silent Disco, Ceilidh, and Karaoke Rumble in the Disco Den, and Piano Man in Studio 54.

Rewind North 
The Rewind North Festival was due to take place at Capesthorne Hall in Cheshire from 2–4 August, but was cancelled the day before due to recent weather conditions and flooding. Main artists lined up had included Bananarama, Tiffany, Thin Lizzy, Cutting Crew, and Gloria Gaynor.

Rewind South 
The Rewind South Festival took place at the Temple Island Meadows, Remenham Farm, Remenham, near Henley-on-Thames from 16–18 August. Main artists included Grandmaster Flash, Tiffany, The Waterboys, and Sister Sledge.

Rewind Festival 2022 
After a period of three years, The Rewind Scotland festival returned after the issues related to Covid.

Rewind Scotland 
The Rewind Festival in Scotland took place at Scone Palace grounds near Perth on 22–24 July.

Rewind North 
The Rewind North Festival is due to take place at Capesthorne Hall in Cheshire from 5–7 August, with Holly Johnson and The Human League being the Headline acts

Rewind South 
The Rewind South Festival is place at the Temple Island Meadows, Remenham Farm, Remenham, near Henley-on-Thames from 19–21 August, with Holly Johnson and The Human League being the Headline acts.

International expansion 

In 2011, the festival expanded to Australia. However, the first attempt met with failure after a change of venue and loss of overseas artists due to lack of work permits.

Since 2012, the festival has expanded internationally to three venues in South Africa (including Cape Town and Johannesburg in 2012, Cape Town, Johannesburg and Durban in 2015), one in United Arab Emirates (Dubai), and one in Thailand (Bangkok).

See also 
List of music festivals in the United Kingdom
 Temple Island Meadows Rewind event venue

References

External links 
Rewind Festival official site
Temple Island Meadows event venue

Music festivals in Oxfordshire
2009 establishments in England
Music festivals established in 2009
Music festivals in Scotland